Ecology of Fear: Los Angeles and the Imagination of Disaster is a 1998 book by Mike Davis examining how contemporary Los Angeles is portrayed in the popular media.

References 

1998 non-fiction books
History of Los Angeles
Sociology books
History books about the United States
Books about urbanism
American non-fiction books
Marxist books
Metropolitan Books books